The 2017 Henderson Insurance Brokers LMP3 Cup Championship was the inaugural season for the British LMP3 Cup. The series started at Donington Park on 22–23 April, and finished at the same circuit on 16–17 September.

Teams 
A total of eight different teams fielded cars across the season. The 79 Nielsen Racing entry was in conjunction with Ecurie Ecosse, and the 22 was run by United Autosports on behalf of Red River Sports.

Races 
The revised 12-race calendar was released on Friday 7 December 2016.

Table 

Points are scored:

With bonus points for pole position and fastest lap.

References

External links
 Official series website

LMP3 Cup